Kiến Xương is a rural district of Thái Bình province in the Red River Delta region of Vietnam. As of 2003 the district had a population of 240,253. The district covers an area of 213 km². The district capital lies at Thanh Nê.

It has 37 villages: An Bồi, Quang Trung, Quang Minh, Bình Minh, Thượng Hiền, Hòa Bình, Quang Bình, Quang Lịch, Vũ Trung, Vũ Quý, Vũ Công, Vũ Bình, Vũ Thắng, Vũ Hoà, Vũ Ninh, Vũ An, Vũ Lê, Vũ Tây, Vũ Sơn, An Bình, Trà Giang, Hồng Thái, Lê Lợi, Nam Cao, Đình Phùng, Thanh Tân, Bình Nguyên, Quốc Tuấn, Quyết Tiến, Quang Hưng, Minh Hưng, Minh Tân, Nam Bình, Bình Thành, Bình Định, Hồng Tiến and town of Thanh Nê.

History
During the Nguyễn Dynasty the Kiến Xương Prefecture was under the authority of the Protector of Nam Định

References

Districts of Thái Bình province